Acalolepta griseipennis is a species of beetle in the family Cerambycidae. It was described by James Thomson in 1857. It is known from Bhutan,  Myanmar, India, Malaysia, and Laos.

References

Acalolepta
Beetles described in 1857